Christo N. Nizamoff (Bulgarian: Христо Николов Низамов) was an American writer, journalist and public figure of Macedonian Bulgarian origin. Born in the village of Jankovec, North Macedonia (then a part of the Ottoman Empire), he is best remembered as an activist of the Macedonian Patriotic Organization and fifth editor of the newspaper "Macedonian Tribune".

Life

Editor of the Macedonian Tribune and advocate for an independent and democratic Macedonia, Christo was educated in Sofia, Bulgaria. He escaped Serbian oppression in Macedonia by immigrating to the United States in 1921. After working in a Connecticut cotton mill, he moved to New York City in 1922 where he directed the Macedonian Press Bureau during the formative years of the Macedonian Patriotic Organization (MPO), which was founded in Fort Wayne and headquartered in Indianapolis. At the request of the MPO leadership, Nizamoff moved to Indianapolis in 1930 on a temporary assignment for the Bulgarian-language weekly Macedonian Tribune. He remained with the paper for 41 years, serving as its editor-in-chief from April 1966 to March 1971.

In 1967 and 1969, Nizamoff was awarded a George Washington Honor Medal plus $100 from the Freedom Foundation of Valley Forge for his editorials. "Abuse of Freedom" was the 1967 winning editorial written after demonstrations in Washington, D.C. Nizamoff wrote the 1969 editorial, "A Need for Rededication", in response to the spread of violent dissent and disruption in the United States during the Nixon administration. He was a founding member of the Indianapolis Press Club in 1934 and was named its Man of the Year in 1966. Nizamoff was inducted into the Indiana Journalism Hall of Fame in 1974. Considered an expert on Balkan affairs, Nizamoff recounted his life in the pursuit of Macedonian independence in his autobiography, A Struggle For Freedom. At the turn of the century, Christo Nizamoff was chosen one of the 12 most influential persons who lived in Indianapolis during the 1900s by the Indianapolis Star. On October 30, 1969, he was invited by US President Richard Nixon and Vice President Spiro Agnew to the White House, along with representatives of other influential foreign language newspapers in the United States.

References

Macedonian Bulgarians
Yugoslav emigrants to the United States
1903 births
1989 deaths